The Curse of Civil War Gold is a nonfiction reality television series on the History channel about the hunt for treasure from the American Civil War.

Cast

Recurring and guests 
 Gary Drayton – A Florida based metal detecting expert who was recommended to the team based on his work on The Curse of Oak Island.
 Dave Van Farowe - Captain of the research vessel Neptune.
 John Chatterton and Howard Ehrenberg – A pair of divers who were called in when Kevin Dykstra was injured and was unable to dive. Chatterton is an experienced wreck diver who has made several dives into the boreholes on Oak Island
 Mark Holley - An underwater archaeologist who works with the team in season 2
 Larry Ring - Boat captain
 Brian Abbott - A sonar expert who uses a sector-scan sonar to map target areas for the team

Overview
Based on a 100 year old deathbed confession from a local lighthouse keeper, Michigan native Kevin Dykstra and his team search for a cache of Civil War Gold, estimated to be worth around $140 million dollars. Dykstra and his team join forces with Marty Lagina from The Curse of Oak Island to try to solve the mystery and find the lost gold.

Episodes

Season 1 (2018)

Season 2 (2019)

References

Sources
 10 Things You Didn't Know about The Curse of Civil War Gold | TV Overmind
 What is The Curse of Civil War Gold? | BT
 What we learned from History's 'The Curse of Civil War Gold' | Mlive
 'The Curse Of Civil War Gold' Premiere Hits Paydirt For History | Deadline
 The Curse of Civil War Gold | Radio Times

External links
 
 

History (American TV channel) original programming
2018 American television series debuts
2019 American television series endings
2010s American reality television series
English-language television shows
Television shows set in Michigan